is a Japanese football player who plays for Segunda División club SD Huesca on loan from Russian club Rostov and the Japan national team as a defensive midfielder.

Club career

Tokyo
Considered one of the best prospects in FC Tokyo's youth ranks, he first joined the first-team squad from the 2011 J.League Division 2 season. He didn't manage to amass much playing time in the squad, so Hashimoto was loaned to Roasso Kumamoto for the 2013 and 2014 seasons.

Rostov
On 9 July 2020, Russian Premier League club FC Rostov announced that they had reached an agreement with FC Tokyo for Hashimoto's transfer, and he would move pending a medical. The Japanese footballer signed a 4-year contract with Rostov after arriving in Russia and completing the medical exam. On 23 August 2020, he scored his first goal for Rostov to secure a 1–0 away victory over FC Ufa. In their next game 3 days later he once again scored the only goal of the game to beat FC Ural Yekaterinburg 1–0.

On 19 February 2021, Rostov removed Hashimoto from their official squad as registered with the league. That was expected to be temporary, as Russian clubs are only allowed to have 8 foreign players registered at the same time, and Hashimoto was injured at the time. He was returned to the squad list on 24 February after the loan of David Toshevski freed up a foreign player spot.

Loan to Vissel Kobe
On 27 March 2022, Hashimoto returned to Japan and signed for Vissel Kobe firstly on a three-month transfer from Russia's FC Rostov after a FIFA ruling temporarily freezing the contracts of foreign players signed with Russian clubs and allowing them to go elsewhere. On 1 July 2022, his contract was officially extended for an undisclosed period.

Loan to Huesca
On 18 July 2022, Hashimoto signed with Huesca in Spain.

International
He made his debut for the Japan national football team on 26 March 2019 in a friendly against Bolivia, as a starter.

Career statistics

Club
Updated to 25 November 2022.

Reserves performance
Last Updated: 25 February 2019

International goals

Honours

Individual
 J.League Best XI: 2019

References

External links

Profile at FC Tokyo

1993 births
Living people
Association football people from Tokyo
Japanese footballers
Japan international footballers
J1 League players
J2 League players
J3 League players
FC Tokyo players
FC Tokyo U-23 players
Roasso Kumamoto players
FC Rostov players
Vissel Kobe players
SD Huesca footballers
J.League U-22 Selection players
Russian Premier League players
Association football midfielders
Japanese expatriate footballers
Expatriate footballers in Russia
Japanese expatriate sportspeople in Russia
Expatriate footballers in Spain
Japanese expatriate sportspeople in Spain